The Honeymoon Express is a lost 1926 silent film drama directed by James Flood, starring Willard Louis and Irene Rich. It was never originally meant to be released. Two runtimes were reported at two separate showings.

Plot
The members of the Lambert household do not get along with each other, so Margaret and her youngest daughter Mary leave their home. Margaret becomes an interior director, resulting in her regaining her happiness. Margaret's son Lance becomes angry at his father John due to the people who are invited over to their home, and Lance starts a career with the help of his mother. John wants Margaret to return, but she refuses to do so. Margaret and her employer Jim become a couple, and so do Mary and Jim's brother Dick. The family becomes reunited, but with Jim as the head of the household.

Production
The film is based on a play titled The Doormat. It was directed by James Flood and the screenwriter was Mary O'Hara. The film was released by Warner Bros. Pictures. It was reported by The Film Daily on July 16, 1926, that Jack L. Warner of Warner Bros. Pictures was withdrawing the film from the releasing schedule, but it was later screened in September 1926 in New York City. The September 8, 1926, showing of the film in New York City was stated by Variety to be 64 minutes long, but it was reported by the magazine that an October 6, 1926, showing was 78 minutes long. The second reported length is more likely to be correct, considering its film reel length of 6,768 feet.

The book American Film Cycles: The Silent Era states that The Honeymoon Express is one of a few silent films that "reflected the decade's extended social tolerance of premarital and extramarital sex, and emphasized that these new freedoms brought additional responsibilities."

Reception
The Palladium-Item said, "Your critic is willing to stake his reputation on the opinion that The Honeymoon Express is the sort of picture to be loved at sight and remembered gratefully long afterward". A  review from The Tuscaloosa News praised the cast and stated, "All members of the family should see The Honeymoon Express".

Cast
Willard Louis as John Lambert
Irene Rich as Mary Lambert
Holmes Herbert as Jim Donaldson
Helene Costello as Margaret Lambert
John Patrick as Nathan Peck
Jane Winton as Estelle
Virginia Lee Corbin as Becky
Harold Goodwin as Lance
Robert Brower as Dick Donaldson

References

External links
The Honeymoon Express @ IMDb.com

lobby card with Irene Rich, Virginia Lee Corbin

1926 films
American silent feature films
Lost American films
Films directed by James Flood
Warner Bros. films
1926 drama films
American black-and-white films
Transitional sound drama films
American drama films
American films based on plays
Lost drama films
1920s American films